Kenneth Richard Davidson (24 December 1905 – 25 December 1954) was an English first-class cricketer, who played thirty 30 matches for Yorkshire County Cricket Club from 1933 to 1935, and one game for Scotland against Yorkshire in 1938.  Slightly unusually for someone who played comparatively little, he was awarded his county cap in 1935. He was an amateur until after the 1933 season, but turned professional and scored 1,241 runs.  He ultimately thought he was too old for a professional career in cricket.

Born in Leeds, Yorkshire, and before he played county cricket, he turned out for Bingley and Leeds, whom he captained for a period. He also played badminton, a sport which he helped to promote in the United States.

A right-handed batsman, he scored 1,355 runs in all first-class cricket at an average of 31.51, and a highest score of 128 against Kent.  His other century, 101*, came against the Marylebone Cricket Club (MCC) and he made seven scores of 50 or over.  He bowled just five balls, which went for four runs.

Davidson died aged 49 on Christmas Day, 1954, at Prestwick Aerodrome, Ayrshire, Scotland, in an air accident.

References

External links
Cricket Archive Statistics

Yorkshire cricketers
1905 births
1954 deaths
Cricketers from Leeds
English cricketers
Victims of aviation accidents or incidents in Scotland
Victims of aviation accidents or incidents in 1954
Scotland cricketers